Lauren Zima  (born November 30, 1987) is an American television personality, entertainment reporter, actress, and producer. She is a senior producer and host at Entertainment Tonight.

Early life 
Zima was raised in Elgin, Illinois, graduated from Elgin High School, and studied journalism at the University of Missouri.

Career 
In 2011, Zima appeared on MTV's Disaster Date. She was hired by Entertainment Tonight in 2015 after a brief stint at Newsy, where she served as a creative director and host. Currently, her coverage for Entertainment Tonight includes hosting The Bachelor: Roses and Rosé, a comedic recap show that is available on YouTube.

Personal life 
As of 2018, Zima has been dating Chris Harrison, who served as host of the ABC reality television dating shows The Bachelor, The Bachelorette, and Bachelor in Paradise. On October 25, 2021 Harrison and Zima announced their engagement.

References

External links 

 

1981 births
Living people
American television hosts
American television reporters and correspondents
American women television journalists
American women television presenters
Actresses from Chicago
Missouri School of Journalism alumni
People from Elgin, Illinois
21st-century American women